The 1979 Montana State Bobcats football team represented the Montana State University as a member of the Big Sky Conference during the 1979 NCAA Division I-AA football season. Led by second-year head coach Sonny Lubick, the Bobcats compiled an overall record of 6–4 and a mark of 6–1 in conference play. They were named the Big Sky champion after Boise State was ruled ineligible.

Schedule

Roster

References

Montana State
Montana State Bobcats football seasons
Big Sky Conference football champion seasons
Montana State Bobcats football